Loomis, also known as Echo, is an unincorporated community in Frontier Rural Municipality No. 19, Saskatchewan, Canada. The community is located on the intersection of Highway 18 and Highway 614, about 70 km southeast of the community of Robsart and about 38 km south of the town of Eastend.

History

Loomis had a few small businesses and storefronts along the main street, with four grain elevators that have since been demolished, and a school that still stands as of today. Since the late thirties, Loomis has slowly died in population and only one family remains.

See also
 List of communities in Saskatchewan
 Ghost towns in Saskatchewan

References

Frontier No. 19, Saskatchewan
Unincorporated communities in Saskatchewan
Populated places established in 1912
1912 establishments in Saskatchewan
Ghost towns in Saskatchewan
Division No. 4, Saskatchewan